One Way Trip may refer to:

 One Way Trip 3D, a 2011 film
 One Way Trip (film), a 2015 film